Tathiana Garbin (born 30 June 1977) is an Italian retired tennis player. She was best known for her surprise defeat of the defending champion and the reigning world No. 1, Justine Henin, in the second round of the 2004 French Open. The winner of one singles and eleven doubles WTA Tour titles, she reached her highest singles ranking of world No. 22 on 21 May 2007, and her highest doubles ranking of No. 25 on 27 August 2001. Other high–ranked players she defeated include Jelena Dokić, Chanda Rubin, Flavia Pennetta, Agnieszka Radwańska, Nadia Petrova, Marion Bartoli, and Samantha Stosur.

WTA career finals

Singles: 5 (1 title, 4 runner-ups)

Doubles: 18 (11 title, 7 runner-ups)

ITF Circuit finals

Singles: 17 (10–7)

Doubles: 17 (11–6)

Grand Slam performance timelines

Singles

Doubles

References

External links
 
 
 Tathiana Garbin: the only website

1977 births
Italian female tennis players
Living people
Olympic tennis players of Italy
Sportspeople from the Metropolitan City of Venice
Tennis players at the 2000 Summer Olympics
Tennis players at the 2004 Summer Olympics
Italian people of Russian descent
Mediterranean Games gold medalists for Italy
Mediterranean Games silver medalists for Italy
Competitors at the 1997 Mediterranean Games
Mediterranean Games medalists in tennis
People from Mestre-Carpenedo